Municipal filter is a procedure for collecting signatures of deputies of representative bodies of municipal entities in support of candidates for the posts of regional heads, as provided for by Russian legislation. The threshold is established in the amount of 5 (Novgorod and Tomsk regions, Sevastopol) to 10 percent (Belgorod and Yaroslavl regions) of the total number of local deputies.

References

Literature 

Election law
Elections in Russia
Law of Russia